Maine Acadian Culture is an affiliated area of the United States national park system, which ties together a variety of sites on the U.S. side of the Saint John River Valley on the Maine–New Brunswick border. The common history of Acadians on both sides of the river is best understood by visiting and learning about sites and events in both Maine and New Brunswick, as well as Nova Scotia. However, the U.S. federal mandate ends at the border, hence the name of this affiliated unit. Its management is overseen by Acadia National Park, the closest staffed U.S. national park system unit, to promote the Maine Acadian Heritage Council's work in highlighting the unique ethnicity and culture of the region.

Sites included in the decentralized unit include:

Acadian Landing Site, also known as the Acadian Cross Historic Shrine (coordinates listed at top-of-page)
Tante Blanche Museum
Fred Albert House
Madawaska School District No. 1
Fort Kent Blockhouse
Fort Kent Railroad Station
Governor Brann Schoolhouse

Acadian Village
Musée Culturel du Mont-Carmel
St. Agathe Museum House
B&A Railroad Turntable
Frenchville Caboose and Water Tower
Allagash Historical Society Museum
Le Club Français
Pelletier-Marquis House

References
National Park Service site
Nat'l Park Foundation site

Acadian history
Parks in Maine
Protected areas of Aroostook County, Maine